Modern fashion journalism is fashion journalism present in fashion articles in magazines, newspapers, and even digitally on websites and blogs.

Fashion journalism consists of several different sectors: fashion writers, reporters, interviewers, etc. Fashion critics criticize clothing lines and brands or fashion events, such as fashion week. Fashion reporters report on the latest trends in the fashion world, and fashion writers are responsible for the write-ups of fashion articles and columns in fashion magazines, websites, and blogs. Fashion journalism consists of fashion interviews with designers and influences people in the fashion world and fashion photographers. Fashion photographers are in charge of capturing clothes, styles, and events to share with others.

History
The history of modern fashion journalism originated in the 18th-century when the fashion dolls was replaced by the fashion magazines, notably the "Cabinet des Modes." During the 19th-century, numerous fashion magazines were published, employing fashion journalists reporting on the latest trends from Paris. Among the earliest in Great Britain were Ann Margaret Lanchester, who published her fashion paper, the "Le Miroir de la Mode," and Mary Ann Bell, writing for the "La Belle Assemblée" in the early 19th-century.

Major influencers of fashion journalism

Vogue 
In 1892, Arthur Baldwin Turnure, an American businessman, founded Vogue, a weekly newspaper aimed at the New York upper class. At that time, Vogue concentrated on documenting and sharing the upper-class lifestyle leading the fashion for the female audience. Still, it also consisted of sport and entertainment for the male audience.

In 1905, Conde Montrose Nast purchased Vogue and expanded the magazine overseas. The magazine, shortly after, shifted its focal audience to women but specifically elite women. Conde Montrose Nast decided to release the magazine's first issue in France in 1920. Later in the late 1930s, Vogue led to the decline of fashion illustrations when they started to replace their well-known illustrated covers with photographic images.

In 1973, Vogue became a monthly publication. Under the editor-in-chief, Grace Mirabella, the magazine when through drastic changes to respond to the change in lifestyle of the audience they were currently targeting. Mirabella was later interviewed and stated that she chose to create those changes in Vogue because "women weren't interested in reading about or buying clothes that served no purpose in their changing lives." She changed the magazine by adding interviews, art coverage, and health pieces, however, she was fired in 1980 when that type of lifestyle became outdated. Currently, Vogue is run by the editor-in-chief, Anna Wintour, who chained Vogue's image to a younger and more approachable image for a large audience. This change allowed the magazine to maintain its high consumption up to this day.

Fashion journalism in the 21st century

Fashion blogging 
A blog is a discussion or informational website as a personal diary created by small groups or companies. Fashion journalism has been affected by blogging. Now regular people blog about what they think about fashion, clothes, and personal style. Fashion industries can sponsor bloggers to talk about what they think of their products.

Vlogging 
Fashion vlogging is similar to blogging. The main difference is that instead of writing, people post videos about clothes, make-up tutorials, and accessories. Vlogging is a new type of branding where anyone could post about how to use these products or what they like or not. Many of these videos are posted to YouTube.

Education 
Fashion journalism is a career people can pursue now. Several colleges have majored on this, such as:
 London College of Fashion
 Haute Future Fashion Academy, Milan, Italy
 Central Saint Martins College of Art and Design
 Academy of Art University, San Francisco, California

Internet 
Fashion journalism has changed drastically since the internet became part of people's lives. It is more accessible than ever before. Fashion industries now publish many of their articles on the internet. A huge change for the 21st century is that people can subscribe to the magazines they want online.

Social media 
Some fashion magazines have created apps where they post articles featuring in the physical magazines, where people can do things such as quizzes and read about a different subject about fashion.

Photographs and videos have been significant for fashion journalism. Now with social platforms, they are speaking louder than words in social media such as Facebook, Twitter, Instagram, and TikTok, among others, fashion journalists post pictures about clothes, accessories, etc.

Big icons of fashion journalism 
 Carmel Snow (1887-1961): Revolutionized the idea of fashion journalism. She opened the doors for photography, art, home, and fiction writing in the magazine's pages in addition to regular fashion stories.
 Grace Mirabella (1930- Today): Came from the business world. She became editor-in-chief of Vogue magazine without much experience in the fashion world. During her 17 years as chief, she demonstrated to the fashion journalism world that business skills were necessary in the editorial world.
 Franca Sozzani (1950-2016): Is a fashion editor in Vogue Italia. She is known for supporting models of any ethnicity or size. On many occasions, she displayed plus-size models on the magazine's cover and devoted a whole article to all-black models and an issue of African cultures.
 Suzy Menkes (1943-Today): Is a famous critic of Vogue. Her opinion is known for being able to make or break a collection. In the 1990s, she wrote about a new channel bag out of style. Recently, she made a strong critic of a Marc Jacobs show that started two hours late.  
 Anna Wintour (1949-Today): is characterized by her short hair, dark black sunglasses, and her passion for young fashion. Since 1998, she has been the chief editor of Vogue Magazine, featuring mixing high and low fashion with much costume and jewelry in the covers. Her primary focus is portraying style as a lifestyle.

References 

Fashion journalism